The men's singles was one of four events in figure skating at the 1908 Summer Olympics. Each nation could enter up to 3 skaters. Sweden's Ulrich Salchow, who had won several World Figure Skating Championships, easily won the gold medal after his main rival, Russia's Nikolai Panin, withdrew either in protest over what he considered unfair judging or due to illness.

Competition format

Each skater had to complete a set of compulsory figures, with a possible score from those figures of 264. There were 7 figures, each of which had to completed in both directions (resulting in a total of 14 figures). Each figure was repeated three times. Marks were given for each figure from 0 to 6 (in half-point increments), then multiplied by a difficulty factor for that figure. 

Each skater also performed a free skate of five minutes, with a score of up to 168. Scores from 0 to 6 were given for each of (a) content (difficulty and variety) and (b) performance. The total was multiplied by 14.

The maximum total possible score was therefore 432. Each judge would then arrange the skaters in order of total score by that judge; these ordinal rankings were used to provide final placement for the skaters, using a "majority rule"--if a majority of the judges ranked a pair first, the pair won. If there was no majority, the total ordinals controlled. Ties were broken by total points.

Results

Three different skaters received a first-place rank from at least one judge: Thorén had one, Johansson had one, and Salchow had three. Because Salchow had a majority, he took the gold medal.

Johansson had a majority of the judges ranking him second or better, and took silver; similarly, Thorén had the majority of the third-place ranks and earned bronze. Greig took fourth, with no judge ranking him worse than that.

No majority was had for fifth-place, however, as the judges were split 2 for March, 2 for Brokaw, and 1 for Torromé. March had the fewest total ordinals (at 29, to Brokaw's 30 and Torromé's 31), so placed fifth. 

Referee:
  Herbert G. Fowler

Judges:
  Henning Grenander
  Edvard Hörle
  Gustav Hügel
  Georg Sanders
  Hermann Wendt

References

Sources
 
 De Wael, Herman. Herman's Full Olympians: "Figure skating 1908". Accessed 2 May 2006.

Men's individual
1908 in figure skating
Men's events at the 1908 Summer Olympics